Brachyuromys is a genus of rodent in the family Nesomyidae. 
It contains the following species:
 Betsileo short-tailed rat (Brachyuromys betsileoensis)
 Gregarious short-tailed rat (Brachyuromys ramirohitra)

References

 
 
 
Taxa named by Charles Immanuel Forsyth Major
Rodent genera
Taxonomy articles created by Polbot